Richard Ridgely (1869–1949) was an American actor and film director active during the silent era.

Selected filmography
 Ranson's Folly (1915)
 Eugene Aram (1915)
 Olive's Greatest Opportunity (1915)
 The Martyrdom of Philip Strong (1916)
 The Heart of the Hills (1916)
 Pride (1917)

References

Bibliography
 Leonhard Gmür. Rex Ingram: Hollywood's Rebel of the Silver Screen. 2013.

American male film actors
American film directors
20th-century American male actors
1869 births
1949 deaths
People from Cynthiana, Kentucky